Federico Scheffler (born 2 March 1950) is a Mexican rower. He competed at the 1972 Summer Olympics and the 1976 Summer Olympics.

References

1950 births
Living people
Mexican male rowers
Olympic rowers of Mexico
Rowers at the 1972 Summer Olympics
Rowers at the 1976 Summer Olympics
Place of birth missing (living people)
Pan American Games medalists in rowing
Pan American Games bronze medalists for Mexico
Rowers at the 1975 Pan American Games
20th-century Mexican people
21st-century Mexican people